Maximiliano Rubén Flotta (born 28 December 1978 in Buenos Aires) is an Argentine retired footballer who is currently the assistant coach of Fortaleza.

Career

Flotta formerly played in Argentina for Arsenal de Sarandí, Tigre, Los Andes, Vélez Sársfield and Club Almagro, in Colombia for Unión Magdalena, Atlético Huila, Deportes Tolima and Club Santa Fe, and in Spain for Deportivo Alavés.

His father is Rubén Flotta.

External links
 
 Argentine Primera statistics at FutbolXXI  
 Statistics at BDFA 

1978 births
Living people
Footballers from Buenos Aires
Argentine footballers
Deportivo Alavés players
Arsenal de Sarandí footballers
Club Atlético Los Andes footballers
Club Almagro players
Club Atlético Vélez Sarsfield footballers
Club Atlético Tigre footballers
Atlético Huila footballers
Deportes Tolima footballers
Independiente Santa Fe footballers
Club Atlético Patronato footballers
Fortaleza C.E.I.F. footballers
Argentine Primera División players
Argentine expatriate footballers
Expatriate footballers in Colombia
Expatriate footballers in Spain
Naturalized citizens of Colombia
Argentine emigrants to Colombia
Association football defenders
Association football midfielders